John Reid (October 14, 1840 – October 7, 1916) was a Scottish-American businessman who has been called "The Father of Golf" in the United States.

Early life
Lyall was born on October 14, 1840 in Dunfermline, Scotland. He was the son of Helen (née Arnot) Reid and Andrew Reid and received his early education in Scotland.

Career
In 1866, Reid emigrated to the United States, and within a few months of his arrival, began working for J. L. Mott Iron Works, which was founded by Jordan L. Mott in 1828.  Reid was eventually promoted to General Manager, which he held for thirty-nine years.  He also served as a trustee of the J. L. Mott Iron Works and a director of the Central Foundry Company, the Central Iron & Coal Company and the Trenton Fire Clay & Porcelain Company.  Upon Jordan L. Mott Jr.'s death in 1915, Reid served as executor of his estate.

He was a member of the Engineers' Club, the Fulton Club, the Society of British Schools and Universities and the Burns Society.  He was also elected a member of the Saint Andrew's Society of the State of New York, of which he served as the 38th President from 1898 to 1899, when he was succeeded by Andrew Carnegie as president.

Interest in golf
Around 1887, he introduced and played the "Royal Scottish Game" on an improvised course near his home and was the leader of the Apple Tree Gang.  On November 14, 1888, at a dinner at his house, he founded and, served as the first president of Saint Andrew's Golf Club located in Hastings-on-Hudson, New York. Reid's portrait by Frank Fowler hangs in the dining room. Today, the club is the oldest golf club in the United States.

Personal life
On October 28, 1873, Reid was married to Elizabeth Eddy "Lizzie" Mudge (1854–1925) at Volcano, Virginia.  Lizzie was the daughter of Daniel C. Mudge and Ellen (née Carr) Mudge.  Together, they resided at 408 Palisades Avenue in Yonkers and were the parents of:

 Andrew Reid (1874–1876), who died in infancy.
 Ellen M. Reid (1876–1962), who married lawyer Alexander Brown Halliday in 1899.
 John Reid Jr. (1878–1925), also a golfer, who helped found the Yale University Golf Club in 1896. He married Jeanette Bull.
 Jean Arnot Reid (1882–1955), a painter.
 Archibald M. Reid (1884–1967), who was a member of the 1902 Yale intercollegiate champion team and captain in 1904.  He was a partner in Carlisle & Jacquelin, and a former president of the United States Golf Association.

After a lingering illness, Reid died on October 7, 1916 at his residence in Yonkers, New York.

References

External links

1840 births
1916 deaths
Businesspeople from New York City
Presidents of the Saint Andrew's Society of the State of New York
British emigrants to the United States
19th-century American businesspeople